Fußball Club Südtirol is an Italian association football club, based in the city of Bolzano, in the autonomous province South Tyrol. The club was formerly known as its bilingual name F.C. Südtirol – Alto Adige. They will play in Serie B for the first time in the 2022–23 season after having been crowned Serie C champions in the current campaign.

History
In the early ‘90s came the idea to bring professional football back to South Tyrol, because since the ‘80s with FC Bolzano, no South Tyrolean team played in a professional league. Negotiations for the takeover of FC Bolzano, which was in financial difficulties, failed. A South Tyrolean entrepreneurial group then took over SV Milland, founded in 1974 and based in a district of Brixen, which played before the acquisition in the season 1994/95 in the regional Eccellenza, but was relegated after that season into the Promozione.

1995-2000: In the amateur leagues
The team was renamed FC Südtirol–Alto Adige in 1995; Alto Adige is the Italian name of the province while Südtirol is its German indigenous name. The club started its first season in 1995 in the regional Promozione (then still the seventh-highest league in Italy). Immediate promotion to the Eccellenza was achieved via a first place finish. From the 1997/98 season, the club played in the national league Serie D (V). Each season, the FC Südtirol was able to improve. In 2000, then under coach Giuseppe Sannino, it was promoted to Serie C2 (IV), the lowest professional league.

2000–2010: FC Südtirol in Serie C2 (IV)
In 2000 the company incorporated as Fußballclub Südtirol S.r.l., thus becoming F.C. Südtirol and relocating to Bolzano (though it was legally based in Brixen until 2011). The club was able to establish itself quickly in the professional league. The aim of the club was to achieve promotion into Serie C1 as soon as possible. The team failed in the following seasons each time in the play-offs. FC Südtirol got into financial difficulties and then focused more on youth work. 
Just before the end of the season 2008/09, youth coach Alfredo Sebastiani took over the first team. With him, the club avoided relegation in the play-outs against Valenzana Calcio. Under Sebastiani, the team in 2009/10 reached for the first time promotion to Serie C1 (III), by finishing the season in first place.

2010 to today: from Serie C to the second division
In the 2010–11 Lega Pro Prima Divisione season, Südtirol was relegated to Lega Pro Seconda Divisione after the relegation "play-out", but on 4 August 2011 was readmitted to Lega Pro Prima Divisione to fill vacancies.

In the next season, the club hired Giovanni Stroppa, who was at that time youth coach of Milan. The team was able to establish itself in the third tier and narrowly missed the promotion play-offs. With good performances, players like Manuel Fischnaller and Alessandro Iacobucci moved to the Serie B. After the season Stroppa became Coach of the Serie A club Pescara.

In the 2012–13 Lega Pro Prima Divisione season, the team was coached by Stefano Vecchi. With him the team was able to reach the promotion playoffs of the Italian third tier for the first time in club history. In the play-off semi-final the team was eliminated by Carpi, which eventually won promotion. In the following season, Vecchi was hired by Carpi.

The 2013–14 season started with Lorenzo D'Anna as coach, previously youth coach of Chievo. Under him, the team could score only five points in the first five matches, which was not enough for the promotion ambitions of the club. They changed coaches and hired Claudio Rastelli. During the championship, the team was able to prevail better and in the end reached third place in the table. That was the best result of the club's history and the repeated achievement of the play-offs. In the quarterfinals, the team prevailed against Como on penalties. In the semi-final, Cremonese was defeated over two legs. The final round for promotion to Serie B was lost against Pro Vercelli.

Südtirol's 2021–22 season turned out to be the most successful in club history, as they won the title race on the final matchday, with a five-point advantage to runners-up Padova, and also reached the 2021–22 Coppa Italia Serie C final, losing on aggregate to Padova. They will therefore play in Serie B in the 2022–23 season, both Südtirol's first time in the league, as well as the very first time a club from Südtirol/Alto Adige qualified for a spot in the Italian second division.

Colors and badge

Colors
The team's colors are white and red. With these colors, the club shows its roots in the Province of South Tyrol and the city of Bolzano, which both have the colors of white and red in their traditional coats of arms and flags. Historically, the home jerseys of the club are white. Most of the time the team plays away matches in red jerseys, but from time to time they can be black as well.

Badge
The current logo of the association is a slightly different form of the badge used since the club was founded in 1995 to 2016. Among other things, the lettering "Alto Adige" was removed. 
The logo of the association is a circular badge with a white-red diamond pattern and a football inside. The logo is circled with the words "FC Südtirol" (German term for "FC South Tyrol") and "Bolzano - Bozen". Compared to the previous badge, the diamond pattern was renewed and the red color darkened slightly.

Club facilities

Stadium
The home games of FC Südtirol are played in the Drusus stadium in Bolzano, named after Nero Drusus, a Roman general. Built in 1936 as a multi-sport facility and wholly renovated between 2019 and 2021 as a pure football ground, the Drusus stadium has a main and opposite tribune and it can accommodate up to 5,500 spectators.

FCS Center

The FCS Center is the training center of the team in Eppan, near Bolzano. In 2015, the training areas were completed and include two natural turf pitches, two artificial turf pitches and another small artificial turf pitch. The service center was opened in 2018 and offers the club changing rooms, offices, a gym with a medical department, meeting rooms, a restaurant and a fan shop. In the training center also the championship games of the national youth teams of FC Südtirol are held. 
In 2010, the training center was the training camp of the Germany national football team for the preparation of the World Cup in South Africa. In 2018, the German national team again used the center for the preparation of the World Cup in Russia.

Current squad

Out on loan

Honours
Serie C
Winner: 2021–22
Serie C2
Winner: 2009–10

Notable players

The following list includes players who played or have played more than 10 matches in either Serie A or Serie B.

  Michael Agazzi
  Dario Bova
  Massimiliano Caputo
  Michael Cia
  Carlo Gervasoni
  Andrea Guerra
  Marco Mallus
  Manuel Mancini
  Luca Mazzitelli
  Marco Moro
  Simone Motta
  Alessandro Noselli
  Manuel Scavone
  Andrea Seculin
  Alessio Sestu
  Giampietro Zecchin
  Arturo Lupoli
  Omar El Kaddouri
 Nicolas Corvetto

Notable managers

The following list includes managers who coached or have coached teams in the Serie A or Serie B.
  Giovanni Stroppa
  Giuseppe Sannino
  Attilio Tesser
  Stefano Vecchi
  Marco Baroni

References

External links
 Official site

 
Football clubs in Italy
Football clubs in South Tyrol
Sport in Bolzano
Association football clubs established in 1974
Serie C clubs
Serie B clubs
1974 establishments in Italy